Cascoplecia insolitis, rarely known as the unicorn fly, is an extinct dipteran that lived in the Early Cretaceous.  The type specimen was found in Burmese amber. George Poinar Jr., who described the fossil, placed the genus into a new family Cascopleciidae.  One of the defining characteristics of Cascoplecia is the presence of three ocelli raised on an extended, horn-like protuberance. The distinctiveness of the family was questioned by other authors, and the genus has been subsequently transferred to the family Bibionidae.

References 

Bibionomorpha genera
Fossil taxa described in 2010
Cretaceous insects of Asia
Burmese amber
Fossils of Myanmar
†
Taxa named by George Poinar Jr.